Credential lag usually occurs for a user who is attempting to log in to a system that relies on updating its cached or otherwise saved user credentials by conferring with Active Directory or similar database.

When a user changes or resets their password, it may take some time for the third party software to retrieve the new credentials from the active directory catalog; for instance, an intranet service that queries AD for permissions.

Example

User "ANOther" is prompted to change her password as it has expired on her windows domain account. Once changed, Active Directory is updated, and the user proceeds to log in. 
However, it may be the case that the internal intranet site only refreshes every 15 minutes, therefore, until the intranet refreshes its credential database, the user is unable to log into the intranet service for up to 15 minutes.

References

Computer access control